Jouni Ensio Kortelainen (born 9 June 1957 in Polvijärvi) is a retired male long-distance runner from Finland. He represented his native country at the 1980 Summer Olympics in the men's marathon. He set his personal best (2:12:09) in the classic distance on 3 May 1980, finishing in fourth place in Chemnitz. Kortelainen won the men's national marathon title in 1986.

Achievements

References

External links

1957 births
Living people
People from Polvijärvi
Finnish male long-distance runners
Finnish male marathon runners
Athletes (track and field) at the 1980 Summer Olympics
Olympic athletes of Finland
Sportspeople from North Karelia